The House at 53 Aegean Avenue is a historic home in the Davis Islands neighborhood of Tampa, Florida, United States. It is located at 53 Aegean Avenue. On August 3, 1989, it was added to the U.S. National Register of Historic Places.

References and external links

 Hillsborough County listings at National Register of Historic Places

Houses in Tampa, Florida
History of Tampa, Florida
Houses on the National Register of Historic Places in Hillsborough County, Florida
Mediterranean Revival architecture of Davis Islands, Tampa, Florida
1926 establishments in Florida